Iris Sheila Collenette (née Darnton) (26 August 1927 – 24 July 2017) was a British botanist, plant collector, and author noted for her work on the flora of Saudi Arabia, particularly her books An illustrated guide to the flowers of Saudi Arabia and Wildflowers of Saudi Arabia. The species Aloe sheilae and Rhytidocaulon sheilae were named in her honor. She collected the holotype of Hypericum collenetteae, named by Norman Robson. She identified at least fourteen species.

Works

References 

1927 births
2017 deaths
Women botanists
20th-century British botanists
20th-century British women scientists
21st-century British botanists
21st-century British women scientists